The Vikšrupis is a river of  Kėdainiai district municipality, Kaunas County, central Lithuania. The river is a right tributary of the Šušvė.

It starts nearby Jakšiai village, then flows to the west through the Pernarava-Šaravai Forest. The lower course is designated as the Pavikšrupys Botanical Zoological Sandtuary.

The hydronym Vikšrupis is a compound noun which the first root vikšr- could mean either 'rush' (vikšris) or 'caterpillar' (vikšras) while the second root up- means 'river' (upė).

References

Rivers of Lithuania
Kėdainiai District Municipality